The Ford Falcon (XK) is a mid-sized car that was produced by Ford Australia between 1960 and 1962. It was the first of seven generations of the Falcon, produced until 2016.

Overview
The first Falcon sold in Australia was the XK series, which was introduced in September 1960. It was initially offered only as a four-door sedan, in both Falcon and Falcon Deluxe trim levels. The XK was essentially a right-hand drive version of the North American model, although local country dealers often included modifications such as heavy-duty rear suspension (five leaves) and larger 6.50 x 13 tyres. Front seat belts were optional.

The steering was light and the ride surprisingly good, on well-paved roads. Whereas the North American model used an 'economy' 3.10:1 rear axle ratio, the Australian Falcon was built with a 3.56:1 ratio which better complemented the torque characteristics of the engine. It had a  turning circle.

The wagon, added to the range in November 1960, was shortened at the rear due to concern that the back of the car might scrape on rough roads and spoon drains.

Billed as being "Australian-with a world of difference", Falcon offered the first serious alternative to Holden, and became an instant success. Sales were aided by the contemporary FB series Holden being perceived as lacklustre and dated by comparison. Two engines were available; a  Falcon Six inline-six, which produced  and an optional  version of the Falcon Six, which produced . The Falcon was available with either a three-speed column shift manual transmission, or a two-speed Ford-O-Matic automatic transmission.

Although the engines were superior to the Holden FB's  inline-six, which produced , and the Holden did not offer an automatic gearbox, the Falcon quickly gained a reputation for weak gearboxes and suspension components, and struggled to take much of Holden's marketshare. This was further compounded by the introduction of the new Holden EJ in July 1962.

The XK range was expanded in May 1961 with the addition of utility and panel van body styles, officially designated as Falcon Utility and Falcon Sedan Delivery, respectively. As with the wagons, these lacked the extended rear overhang of their American counterparts, and also used the four-door front doors rather than the longer two-door units used by the Ranchero and US sedan delivery. When production of the XK Falcon ended in August 1962, 68,465 units had been sold. The Falcon was also exported in small numbers to the various Empire colonies and Commonwealth nations. Pricing for a base model XK Falcon started at £1,137 ($2,274 AUD)

References

XK
Cars of Australia
Cars introduced in 1960
Cars discontinued in 1962
XK Falcon
Sedans
Station wagons
Coupé utilities
Vans
Rear-wheel-drive vehicles